Juncus subulatus, called the Somerset rush, is a species of flowering plant in the genus Juncus, with a Mediterranean, Middle Eastern and Central Asian distribution, and introduced to Great Britain. It typically grows in salt marshes.

References

subulatus
Flora of North Africa
Flora of Southwestern Europe
Flora of Southeastern Europe
Flora of Western Asia
Flora of the Transcaucasus
Flora of Central Asia
Plants described in 1775